Bahaddur Bandi, also spelled Bahaddurbandi is a village in the Koppal taluk of Koppal district in the Indian state of Karnataka.  Bahaddur Bandi is located south to District Headquarters Koppal and is 4 km from Koppal city.

Bahaddur Bandi Fort
A famous fort on the name of Banda Singh Bahadur  is located  near Koppal . It was built in the 17th century.

Demographics
As of 2001 India census, Bahaddur Bandi had a population of 2,545 with 1,300 males and 1,245 females and 422  Households.

See also 
 Gangavathi
 Irakalgada
 Kushtagi
 Hospet
 Koppal

References

External links 
 www.koppal.nic.in

Villages in Koppal district